Flexor retinaculum may be:

 Flexor retinaculum of the hand
 Flexor retinaculum of foot 